Community Consolidated School District 146 is located in the southwest suburbs of Chicago, Illinois, United States.  It is home to approximately 2500 students.

The Administration Center is located at 6611 W 171st Street in Tinley Park, IL.  The Superintendent for the CCSD146 is Dr. Jeff Stawick.

Schools

The District has four elementary schools and one middle school. The Pre-k through 5th grade schools are:
 Fierke Education Center in Oak Forest, IL.  The principal is Mr. Bret Pingatiello. Their mascot is the bee stinger and the school colors are black and yellow.
 Fulton School in Tinley Park, IL. The principal is Mr. Ronald Gonser. The school mascot is the flames and the school color is royal blue.
 Kruse Education Center in Orland Park, IL.  The principal is Mrs. Carey Radde.  The mascot is a bear and the school colors are red and yellow.
 Memorial School in Tinley Park, IL.  The principal is Mrs. Kelly Voliva. The mascot is an eagle and the school color is red.

The middle school is grades 6-8:
 Central Middle School is in Tinley Park, IL and the principal is Mr. Randy Fortin.  The school mascot is a twister and the school colors are navy blue and silver.

External links

References

School districts in Cook County, Illinois